Craig Hill (born 4 May 1982) is a Welsh rugby union player. An openside flanker, he first played his senior rugby for Caerphilly aged 18, before joining Newport in 2002, and moving to Pontypridd RFC in 2003. He then played club rugby for Newport RFC after returning in 2005 and the Newport Gwent Dragons regional team. He made his debut for the Dragons 9 May 2009 against Edinburgh. He was released by Newport at the end of the 2011–12 season.

Hill made his Wales Sevens debut in 2008 at the Dubai leg of the IRB series and also represented the Wales national rugby sevens team in other IRB competitions throughout 2009, most notably winning the Sevens Rugby World Cup in Dubai, and also along the way to lifting the trophy scored the first hat trick of the competition in the opening game against Zimbabwe.

References

Rugby union players from Cardiff
Welsh rugby union players
Pontypridd RFC players
Dragons RFC players
Newport RFC players
Living people
1982 births
Male rugby sevens players